Frenching the Bully is the debut studio album by Seattle punk rock band The Gits.  It was originally released as a 12-track album on C/Z Records in 1992 but was later reissued in 2003 with bonus tracks and different cover art on the Broken Rekids label. "A stunning document of the talent ... [of] singer Mia Zapata ... She sings with such conviction, ferocity, and expressiveness that the lyrics become irrelevant. The band becomes irrelevant." –River Cities' Reader

It was selected by Russ Rankin as a top 10 favorite album.

Track listing
 "Absynthe"   – 3:13
 "Another Shot of Whiskey"  – 2:43
 "Insecurities"   – 1:46
 "Slaughter of Bruce"  – 3:18
 "Kings and Queens"  – 2:00
 "It All Dies Anyway"   – 4:10
 "While You're Twisting, I'm Still Breathing"   – 2:38
 "A"  – 1:26
 "Wingo Lamo"   – 2:13
 "Cut My Skin, It Makes Me Human"  – 2:19
 "Here's to Your Fuck"   (F. Booth)  – 1:53
 "Second Skin"   – 2:51

Reissue track listing 
 "Absynthe" - 3:13
 "Another Shot Of Whiskey" - 2:41
 "Insecurities" - 1:45
 "Slaughter Of Bruce" - 3:16
 "Kings And Queens" - 1:59
 "It All Dies Anyway" - 4:07
 "While You're Twisting, I'm Still Breathing" - 2:37
 "A" - 1:24
 "Wingo Lamo" - 2:11
 "Spear And Magic Helmet" - 2:37
 "Cut My Skin, It Makes Me Human" - 2:16
 "Here's To Your Fuck" (F. Booth) - 1:52
 "Second Skin" - 2:51
 "While You're Twisting, I'm Still Breathing (Live)" - 2:38
 "Insecurities (Live)" - 1:48
 "Slaughter Of Bruce (Live)" - 3:14
 "Absynthe (Live)" - 3:04
 "Another Shot Of Whiskey (Live)" - 2:40
 "Wingo Lamo (Live)" - 2:19
 "Here's To Your Fuck (Live)" - 1:50
 "Second Skin (Live)" - 3:13
 "While You're Twisting, I'm Still Breathing (Single Version)" - 2:43
Live tracks recorded at the X-Ray Cafe, Portland, Oregon in June 1993.

References 

1992 debut albums
The Gits albums
Albums produced by Steve Fisk
Hardcore punk albums by American artists